The 1971 British National Track Championships were a series of track cycling competitions held during the summer of 1971.

Medal summary

Men's Events

Women's Events

References

National Track Championships